Belgium has participated at the Youth Olympic Games in every edition since the inaugural 2010 Games and has earned medals from every edition.

Medal tables

Medals by Summer Games

Medals by Winter Games

Medals by summer sport

Medals by winter sport

List of medalists

Summer Games

Summer Games medalists as part of Mixed-NOCs Team

Winter Games

Winter Games medalists as part of Mixed-NOCs Team

Flag bearers

See also
Belgium at the Olympics
Belgium at the Paralympics

References

External links
Belgian Olympic Committee

 
Youth Olympics
Nations at the Youth Olympic Games
Youth sport in Belgium